This name uses Portuguese naming customs. The first or maternal family name is Mendes and the second or paternal family name is Umpeça.

Eridson (born 25 June 1990) is a Bissau-Guinean footballer who plays as a defender.

Club career
In his youth Eridson played for the youth of football club "Porto" and "Estrela Amadora."

He began his professional career in "Tourizense" club, where he spent two years. Later, he was invited to "Pacos de Ferreira". The club did not count on it. He gave in rent for the season, where he was able to get match practice. In the three years spent Eridson for "Pacos de Ferreira" in only 6 matches of the championship, everything - in the first half of the 2011/12 season.

In 2014, he moved to the "Academica de Viseu", where he was able to start playing bad. At the end of the season Eridson spent over thirty matches and scored one goal. In 2015, he moved to another club of the second division in Portugal - "Freamunde", which is not a player base.

International career
Eridson played his first game for the national team February 9, 2011 in a friendly match against Gambia. The first goal for the national team scored 5 September 2015 in a game against the Congo, established on 80 minutes, the final score of the match 2-4.

International goals
Scores and results list Guinea-Bissau's goal tally first.

References

External links

1990 births
Living people
Sportspeople from Bissau
Bissau-Guinean footballers
Primeira Liga players
Liga Portugal 2 players
F.C. Paços de Ferreira players
Portimonense S.C. players
C.F. Os Belenenses players
Atlético Clube de Portugal players
Académico de Viseu F.C. players
S.C. Freamunde players
Liga II players
ACS Foresta Suceava players
Guinea-Bissau international footballers
Bissau-Guinean expatriate footballers
Bissau-Guinean expatriate sportspeople in Portugal
Expatriate footballers in Portugal
Expatriate footballers in Romania
Bissau-Guinean expatriate sportspeople in Romania
2017 Africa Cup of Nations players
Association football defenders